Atzalán is a city in the Mexican state of Veracruz, and the municipal seat of the municipality of the same name.

External links 
  Municipal Official Site
  Municipal Official Information

Populated places in Veracruz